TUC is a brand of salted octagonal golden-yellow crackers, comparable in taste to Ritz crackers. The TUC brand originated in Belgium, and belonged to French company LU.

Nowadays, TUC crackers are owned by Mondelēz International, which markets the brand in mainland India, while Valeo Foods' Jacob Fruitfield Food Group produces TUC crackers for markets in Europe, Asia, North America, and North Africa. In Pakistan, TUC is manufactured and marketed by LU (Continental Biscuits) and by United Biscuits in the United Kingdom.

Varieties 
There are some varieties of TUC biscuits available:

 Original
 Mini TUC – Original
 Cheese Sandwich
 Cheese (standard, not sandwich)
 Barbecue
 Original
 Sour Cream and Onion
 Bacon
 Garlic and Herbs
 Paprika
 Break
 Break Rosemary & Olive
 Salt & Pepper
 Sweet Chili
 Roasted Chicken
 Samphire
 Seeds & Chives
 Pizza
 Baked Bites

See also 
 TUC The Lighter Side of Life

References

External links
  (Mondelez)
 TUC Time website (archived, 3 Apr 2010)

Mondelez International brands
Brand name crackers